Demetrias is a genus of ground beetle native to the Palearctic (including Europe), the Near East, and North Africa. It contains the following species:

 Demetrias amurensis Motschulsky, 1860
 Demetrias atricapillus (Linnaeus, 1758)
 Demetrias imperialis Germar, 1824
 Demetrias longicollis Chaudoir, 1877
 Demetrias longicornis Chaudoir, 1846
 Demetrias marginicollis Bates, 1883
 Demetrias monostigma Samouelle, 1819
 Demetrias muchei Jedlicka, 1967
 Demetrias nigricornis Chaudoir, 1877

References

External links
Demetrias at Fauna Europaea

Lebiinae
Palearctic insects
Taxa named by Franco Andrea Bonelli